Jamestown railway station served the village of Jamestown, in the historical county of Dunbartonshire, Scotland, from 1856 to 1964 on the Forth and Clyde Junction Railway.

History 
The station was opened on 26 May 1856 by the Forth and Clyde Junction Railway. To the east were two sidings, near the goods yard, which served Levenbank Print Works. A siding to the south was used to park a goods train. The platforms were eventually extended. A signal box was built in 1892. The station closed to passengers on 1 October 1934.

References 

Disused railway stations in West Dunbartonshire
Railway stations in Great Britain opened in 1856
Railway stations in Great Britain closed in 1934
1856 establishments in Scotland
1964 disestablishments in Scotland